Heimler syndrome is a rare autosomal recessive condition characterized by sensorineural hearing loss, amelogenesis imperfecta, nail abnormalities and occasional or late-onset retinal pigmentation

Signs/symptoms

This condition is characterised by sensorineural hearing loss, enamel hypoplasia of the secondary dentition, nail abnormalities and occasional or late-onset retinal pigmentation abnormalities.

Genetics

This condition is caused by mutations in peroxisomal biogenesis factor 1 (PEX1) or peroxisomal biogenesis factor 6 (PEX6) genes. These gene are involved in peroxisome biogenesis. PEX 1 is located on long arm of chromosome 7 (7q21).2 PEX 6 is located on the short arm of chromosome 6 (6p21). These genes encode AAA+ ATPases. They form part of the mechanism that shuttles the peroxisome targeting signal receptor protein PEX5 back to the cytosol after release of its protein cargo within the peroxisomal lumen.

Diagnosis

The diagnosis is made on clinical grounds and confirmed by gene sequencing.

Treatment

There is no treatment for this condition known at present.

Prognosis

This condition tends to produce only mild abnormalities. Life expectancy is normal.

Epidemiology

This is rare disorder. Precise estimates of its prevalence are not known but it appears be to be < 1/106

History

This condition was first described in 1991.

References

External links 

Autosomal recessive disorders